Black Mirror is a British science fiction anthology series created by Charlie Brooker. The programme was inspired by The Twilight Zone and explores technology and its side-effects. It began on the British television network Channel 4 before moving to the American streaming platform Netflix and has run for five series between 2011 and 2019. There are 22 episodes and one interactive film, Black Mirror: Bandersnatch. Episodes vary in length between 41 and 89 minutes and can be watched in any order. Actors rarely appear in more than one episode, though many instalments make small references known as "Easter eggs" to previous episodes, such as through in-universe news channels and briefly-seen text.

The first two series comprised three episodes each and ran on Channel 4 in December 2011 and February 2013. After discussions for a third series fell through, a special entitled "White Christmas" was commissioned and aired in December 2014. The following year, Netflix commissioned twelve episodes, later splitting this into two series of six episodes that were released on 21 October 2016 and 29 December 2017. The interactive film Bandersnatch was spun out from the fifth series due to its complexity, debuting on 28 December 2018, and the delayed fifth series of three episodes premiered on 5 June 2019. It was confirmed in May 2022 that a sixth series was in production.

Episodes are usually dystopian, often with unhappy endings, and many are set in a futuristic world with advanced technology. The instalments have spanned a variety of genres including drama, psychological horror, political satire, and romantic comedy. Black Mirror has been met with positive reception from critics and has received numerous awards and nominations, including three consecutive wins of the Primetime Emmy Award for Outstanding Television Movie.

Series overview

Episodes

Series 1 (2011)

Series 2 (2013)

Special (2014)

Series 3 (2016)

Series 4 (2017)

Interactive film (2018)

Series 5 (2019)

Home media release

Ratings
The given ratings approximate the number of viewers within seven days of its premiere on Channel 4. Rating figures are not available for episodes that debuted on Netflix, which does not publish such data for the majority of its content.

References

Notes

Citations

General references

External links
 
 

 
Lists of anthology television series episodes
Lists of British drama television series episodes
Lists of British science fiction television series episodes